Harbingers is the tenth volume in a series of Repairman Jack books written by American author F. Paul Wilson. The book was first published by Gauntlet Press in a signed limited first edition (May 2006), later as a trade hardcover from Forge (September 2006), and finally as a mass market paperback from Forge (August 2007).

References

American horror novels
2006 American novels
Repairman Jack (series)